Club Deportivo Vista Hermosa (1999  2012) was a Salvadoran professional football club, based in San Francisco Gotera, Morazán. The team known as the Los Correcaminos ("Roadrunners") gradually worked their way upwards to win the El Salvador first division football championship of 2005. Vista Hermosa represented El Salvador in the CONCACAF and FIFA international competitions. The team's initial home stadium was the Estadio Luis Amílcar Moreno in San Francisco Gotera, Morazán. In 2009, the club moved to the Estadio Correcaminos.

In 2012, the club's licence was sold to the city of Nueva Guadalupe, which started operation as C.D. Guadalupano in the 2013–14 Segunda División de Fútbol Salvadoreño season.

Third division
C.D. Vista Hermosa was founded on 17 April 1999, by José Gilberto Flores (Paquito Flores). The club's first president was José Gilberto Montoya. He retired for health reasons on 28 December 2000. Pedro Hernandez became the next president who was supported by the club's staff and supporters.

When Hernandez became president, the club was in the third division of Salvadoran soccer. The team was contending for a place in the finals game but lost to Gerardo Barrios University, three points to two. In light of the club's good performance in the third division, Francisco Benitez made an offer to purchase the club for 5,000 Salvadoran colon, approximately 560.85 US dollars. The offer was rejected as being too low. However, in the following season, the club performed poorly and finances were mismanaged. Lacking patrons and sponsors, the club was left in debt to an amount of two billion colon. The club was relegated to the fourth division. On 1 December 2001, Benitez purchased the club for 3,000 colon and became the new president.

A payment of 2,000 colon by Benitez in December 2003 secured the club a place in the second division in the 20032004 season.

Second division
The team won its first match in the second division league of 2004  2005. There was much competition in the second division league to advance to the first division with computerised scores scrutinized in detail by the teams and judges.

In the first round of games, Group A drew Fuerte San Francisco, Juventud Independiente, Telecom and Inca Súper Flat. Group B drew Vista Hermosa, C.D. Dragón, C.D. Chalatenango and Independiente Nacional 1906. In the second round, Group A drew Fuerte San Francisco, C.D. Dragón, Independiente Nacional 1906, and Telecom. Group B drew Vista Hermosa, C.D. Chalatenango, Juventud Independiente, and Inca Súper Flat.

In semi-final 1 the competitors were Vista Hermosa and Telecom. Vista Hermosa won 3 points to 2 and after penalties were considered, won four points to three. In semi-final 2, Independiente Nacional 1906 defeated Juventud Independiente, six points to one.

In the final, Vista Hermos played Independiente Nacional 1906. For Vista Hermos, José Mario Martínez was a key player and the team won five points to four. René Domingo Alvarez was effective in the overtime.

The players for Vista Hermosa were: González, Sánchez, Torres, Chinchilla, Romero, Campos, Quiñónez, Portillo, Márquez, Ávila, and Mosquera. The substituting players were Álvarez (31), Sosa (46) and Hernández (104). the players for Independiente Nacional 1906 (Coca-Cola) were Trinidad, González, Martínez, González, Granado, González, Escalante, Alvarado, Montes, and Ramirez. The substituting players were Alfaro (46), Pérez (60) and Pasadi (65).

Data:
Herbert Marquez, time goal 36, 39, 86,
Eider Mosquera, time goal 59,
René Domingo Alvarez, time goal 119,
Elías "Chilena" Montes, time goal 21, 24, 82, 
Ramirez, time goal 43.

First division
The team was the youngest to win both the second and first division competitions since 1974. At this time, the club created the Correcaminos (roadrunners) brand dedicated to assisting disadvantaged youth.

The team finished second on the Apertura 2005 series table with ten wins, seven losses and one draw. In the semi-finals, the team defeated C.D. Luis Ángel Firpo. In the final, the team played A.D. Isidro Metapán, a strong side that was the favourite.  During the season, Metapan had allowed only 13 goals against them in 18 games and had strong players such as Dago Portillo (keeper), William Reyes, Guillermo Rivera and William Osorio. Their strong offensive teams included Barroche-Mosquera and Luis Chicho Elder Figueroa and Torres.

Vista Hermosa's championship squad included Manuel González, Giovanny Romero, Luis Torres (Colombia), Juan Carlos Chinchilla, René Domingo Álvarez, José Eduardo Campos, Elder Figueroa (Colombia), Manfredi Portillo, Herbert Márquez, Patricio Gómez Barroche (Argentina), Cristian Gil Mosquera (Colombia), Mario Deras, Pablo Hernández, Nelson Flores, Danilo Martinez, Mario Chévez Rene Escobar, Marlon Avila, Carlos Aparicio, Alfonso Perla, and René Domingo Álvarez. The coach was Mario Martinez (El Salvador).

No goals were scored by either team in the official 90 minutes of the game. The game may have been decided on penalties but then Mario Deras entered (121) and scored (181). When Mario Deras scored twice in extra time, Vista Hermosa won the championship. This was the club's only title in the first division. The club produced players who went on to play in the El Salvador national team. They included Salvador Coreas, Leonel Guevara, and Osael Romero.

Vista Hermosa finished the 2006  2007 season in ninth place with 44 points and entered a repechage. It was played against Juventud Independiente in two parts. In the first game at San Juan Opico, Vista Hermosa won five points to two. In the first half, Patricio Barroche scored the first goal, Manfredi Portillo the second, Gil Mosquera the third and Patricio Barroche again the fourth. Luis Torres scored to make the score five points to nil. In the second half, the Juventud Independiente player, Carlos "Nene" Escalante scored at 53 minutes and 70 minutes. In the second game of the repechage at Estadio Municipal Luis Amilcar Moreno, Vista Hermosa's home grounds, the club defeated Juventud Independiente two points to nil. Gil Mosquera and Patricio Barroche scored one goal each for Vista Hermosa.

In the 2006 Clausura series, Patricio Barroche was the player with the most goals (14).

In the 2007 Clausura series, Vista Hermosa came first in the table with 44 points. The team then defeated Juventud Independiente five points to nil and two points to nil to remain in the first division. The team played an extra game against C. D. Luis Angel Firpo to define the fourth placed semi-finalist. Firpo won three points to nil. In the 2007 Apertura series, Vista Hermosa reached the semi-finals but was defeated three points to nil by Firpo.

In the 2008 Clausura series, the team came fourth on the table and entered the semi-finals but was defeated by Firpo. In the 2008 Apertura series, missed out on the semi-finals by one point lost to C. D. Chalatenango.

In the 2009 Clausura series, the team finished seventh on the table. Nico Muñoz was named as the player with the most goals (10). In the 2009 Apertura series, Vista Hermosa again entered a repechage. The team played Metapan who won one point to nil. Nico Muñoz was named the player with the most goals (11).

In the 2010 Clausura series, the tem lost in the semi-finals to Aguila. In the 2010 Apertura series, the team reached sixth place in the table.

Decline and ending
During the 2011 season, the club suffered financial hardships which caused them to lose ownership of their new stadium. Three members of the owner consortium were accused of drug trafficking. The team's performance fell and after seven seasons, the club was relegated. Following this, the city of Nueva Guadalupe invested in the team, which adjusted its name to "Club Deportivo Vista Hermosa Guadalupe" for the 2012–13 Segunda División de Fútbol Salvadoreño season, based in San Miguel.

However, after one season, the mayor of Nueva Guadalupe purchased the license outright, broke all links to the original Vista Hermosa, and started a new club in Nuevo Guadalpue called C.D. Guadalupano. Vista Hermosa ceased to exist after 12 years of existence, 11 of which were played in La Primera.

C.D. Guadalupano first competed in the 2013–14 Segunda División de Fútbol Salvadoreño, but also ceased operation, in 2015.

On February 26, 2017, it was announced that the new team will carry the CD Vista Hermosa name and carry on the Vista Hermosa legacy. They currently play in Liga Media/ADFA Morazan.

Table of results (2005  2012)
Apertura 2005 – Clausura 2012

International games

Team coaches

Sponsorship

Top goalscorers 

note: Number three all time team Vista Hermosa goal scorer Osael Romero left the team in 2010. A few months later, at the 2011 CONCACAF Gold Cup Group A, he participated in a match fixing scheme while playing with the El Salvador national team during a 5–0 loss Mexico; the scheme was not discovered until 2013, when Romero (and 13 others) were banned for life.

References

1999 establishments in El Salvador
Association football clubs established in 1999
Association football clubs disestablished in 2013
Vista Hermosa